Kvås is a village in Lyngdal municipality in Agder county, Norway. The Kvås Church lies at the center of the village. Kvås was the administrative centre of the old municipality of Kvås from 1909 until its dissolution in 1963.

Name
The village (originally the parish) is named after the old Kvås farm (Old Norse: Kváss), since that is where the Kvås Church is located. The meaning of the name probably refers to a "valley" or "hollow".

References

Villages in Agder
Lyngdal